Gölyaka is a town in Düzce Province in the Black Sea region of  Turkey. It is the seat of Gölyaka District. Its population is 10,516 (2022). The mayor is Yakup Demircan (AKP).

References

Populated places in Düzce Province
Gölyaka District
Towns in Turkey